The Coldwater River is a river which flows for  through northwestern Mississippi in the United States.  It is a tributary of the Tallahatchie River, and part of the watershed of the Mississippi River, via the Yazoo River.

In the past, the Coldwater River has been referred to as the Okalopasaw, Copasaw, or Cold Water River.  The one-word name "Coldwater" was officially settled upon in 1891.

Course
The Coldwater River rises in Marshall County, Mississippi, along Mississippi Highway 4 near the Benton County line.  The river then flows northwest through a corner of Benton County and then the breadth of Marshall county to a point just south of the unincorporated community of Barton, where it turns southwest as it enters DeSoto County.  Along the Desoto County-Tate County line, the river is impounded by a U.S. Army Corps of Engineers dam to form Arkabutla Lake.

From Arkabutla Lake the Coldwater River takes a mostly southerly course, flowing roughly parallel to the nearby Mississippi River, as the Coldwater forms the boundary between Tate and Tunica counties, and then passes through Quitman County to its confluence with the Tallahatchie River south of the town of Marks.
At Savage, the river averages a flow of 1,368 cubic feet per second.

See also
List of Mississippi rivers

References

Sources
US EPA Watershed assessment database Coldwater River watershed

External links
 Arkabutla Lake

Rivers of Mississippi
Bodies of water of Marshall County, Mississippi
Bodies of water of Benton County, Mississippi
Bodies of water of DeSoto County, Mississippi
Bodies of water of Tate County, Mississippi
Bodies of water of Tunica County, Mississippi
Bodies of water of Quitman County, Mississippi